is a Japanese former volleyball player who competed in the 1988 Summer Olympics and 1992 Summer Olympics. In 1988, she finished fourth with the Japanese team in the Olympic tournament. Four years later, she finished fifth with the Japanese team in the 1992 Olympic tournament.

References

1965 births
Living people
Japanese women's volleyball players
Olympic volleyball players of Japan
Volleyball players at the 1988 Summer Olympics
Volleyball players at the 1992 Summer Olympics
Asian Games medalists in volleyball
Volleyball players at the 1986 Asian Games
Volleyball players at the 1990 Asian Games
Medalists at the 1986 Asian Games
Medalists at the 1990 Asian Games
Asian Games silver medalists for Japan
Asian Games bronze medalists for Japan
Pan American Games medalists in volleyball
Pan American Games gold medalists for the United States
Medalists at the 1987 Pan American Games